The 2008 Louisiana–Lafayette Ragin' Cajuns baseball team represented the University of Louisiana at Lafayette in the 2008 NCAA Division I baseball season. The Ragin' Cajuns played their home games at M. L. Tigue Moore Field and were led by fourteenth year head coach Tony Robichaux.

Roster

Coaching staff

Schedule and results

References

Louisiana Ragin' Cajuns baseball seasons
Louisiana-Lafayette baseball
Louisiana-Lafayette